Acanthodactylus margaritae is a species of lizard in the family Lacertidae. The species is endemic to Morocco.

Etymology
The specific name, margaritae, is in honor of Greek herpetologist Margarita Metallinou, who died tragically while doing field work in Africa in 2015.

Geographic range
A. margaritae is found in southern Morocco.

Habitat
A. margaritae inhabits a variety of desert and semidesert habitats, including stony plains, stable sands, fixed dunes, hard clay with sparse low vegetation, and open argan tree forest.

Description

Reproduction
A. margaritae is oviparous.

References

Further reading
Tamar, Karin; Geniez, Philippe; Brito, José C.; Crochet, Pierre-André (2017). "Systematic revision of Acanthodactylus busacki (Squamata: Lacertidae) with a description of a new species from Morocco". Zootaxa 4276 (3): 357–386. (Acanthodactylus margaritae, new species). 

Acanthodactylus
Reptiles described in 2017
Taxa named by Karin Tamar
Taxa named by Philippe Geniez
Taxa named by José C. Brito
Taxa named by Pierre-André Crochet